Luis Sarmento was the Imperial ambassador to Portugal in 1536. He represented Charles V, Holy Roman Emperor and King of Spain.

References

Year of birth missing
Year of death missing
16th-century diplomats
Ambassadors of the Holy Roman Empire to Portugal
16th-century people of the Holy Roman Empire
16th-century German people